Crollalanza is an Italian surname. Notable people with the surname include:

 Araldo di Crollalanza (1892–1986), Italian journalist and politician
 Giovan Battista di Crollalanza (1819–1892), Italian writer

Italian-language surnames